Tomorrow's Warriors is a jazz music education and artist development organisation that was co-founded in 1991 by Janine Irons and Gary Crosby, committed to championing diversity, inclusion and equality across the arts through jazz, with a special focus on "Black musicians, female musicians and those whose financial or other circumstances might lock them out of opportunities to pursue a career in the music industry". Crosby drew inspiration from having been a member of the Jazz Warriors, a London-based group of musicians that in the 1980s showcased many young Black British musicians who went on to achieve international success (among them Courtney Pine, Steve Williamson, Cleveland Watkiss, Phillip Bent, Orphy Robinson, as well as Crosby himself). Tomorrow's Warriors, which has a multiracial make-up, provides a platform for young musicians wishing to pursue a career in jazz, and aims "to inspire, foster and grow a vibrant community of artists, audiences and leaders who together will transform the lives of future generations by increasing opportunity, diversity and excellence in and through jazz." Alumni of Tomorrow's Warriors have gone on to win several awards.

Irons, a former vocalist turned manager and producer, and her partner Crosby also initiated the Dune Records label, which draws on talent from Tomorrow's Warriors, including such graduates of the organisation as Denys Baptiste, J-Life and Soweto Kinch.

Background
Since its inception by Gary Crosby and Janine Irons in 1991, Tomorrow's Warriors has worked towards devising and producing inspirational programmes and performance opportunities for new and emerging musicians, at the same time as developing culturally diverse audiences, being considered to have "nurtured many of the UK's leading jazz performers via its award-winning jazz education and emerging artists programme" with Tomorrow's Warriors alumni winning more than 50 awards and achieving successful careers in the music industry.;

Over the years Tomorrow's Warriors' activities have included a regular jam session, formerly held weekly at The Jazz Café, then from 2004 at The Spice of Life in Soho, where it remained active until Summer 2010. The company went on to become a weekend resident at the Southbank Centre in London. The Tomorrow's Warriors' programme provides a wide variety of opportunities ranging from workshops and showcases for young musicians to concerts and tours for established professional bands and orchestras, partnering with a network of local, national and international arts organisations, as well as commercial producers, venues, promoters and festivals. Tomorrow's Warriors is a National Portfolio Organisation of Arts Council England. Trustees of Tomorrow's Warriors include Steve Abbott, Viv Broughton, Margaret Busby, Lainy Malkani, Nicky O'Donnell and Chris Panayi.

Ensembles
Members of Tomorrow's Warriors, as well as participating in informal jam sessions, may go on to join one of the more formal ensembles, which include Tomorrow's Warriors StringTing, Tomorrow's Warriors Female Collective, a Junior Band (for young musicians aged between 11 and 15), Tomorrow's Warriors Youth Orchestra, and the flagship Nu Civilisation Orchestra.

Nu Civilisation Orchestra
In 2008, Tomorrow's Warriors established an orchestra initially to provide a platform for pianist/composer Peter Edwards – who was a participant in the young artist development programme – to recreate Duke Ellington's rarely performed The Queen's Suite. The orchestra was subsequently established as a permanent ensemble, under the musical direction of Edwards, called the Nu Civilisation Orchestra (NCO).

Other major projects undertaken by the NCO include in 2013 a 50th-anniversary recreation of Charles Mingus's The Black Saint and the Sinner Lady (1963) at the Purcell Room, about which London Jazz News wrote: "The ensemble was flawless. ...hard to imagine anyone in the packed Purcell room doubting that this was a moving, breathing work. The recording remains a wonder, but recreated live the music seemed fresh as ever and more vividly coloured, more intense. The result was like getting up close to a great painting you have only seen in reproduction: you get a fresh sense of why it is a masterpiece. I really hope it can be heard more widely." More recently the NCO performed a live soundtrack to John Akomfrah's 2013 film The Stuart Hall Project, and on International Women's Day 2017 played a concert of songs (featuring Lisa Hannigan, Sabrina Mahfouz and ESKA) from Joni Mitchell's classic 1976 album Hejira, at the Royal Festival Hall as part of the Women of the World Festival.

In April 2017 it was announced that the NCO had secured a new residency at Rich Mix in east London.

In 2022, as part of the EFG London Jazz Festival, the Nu Civilisation Orchestra led by musical director Peter Edwards and featuring ESKA on vocals undertook a national tour presenting Mitchell's Hejira and Mingus about which the reviewer for The Arts Desk said: "Exceeding all hopes, this made Mingus and Mitchell’s visions as vivid as they’ve ever been, and as breathtakingly advanced. An unbelievable experience."

Other initiatives 
In 2016, Tomorrow's Warriors announced a partnership with Jazz House Kids in Montclair, New Jersey, through which four young people from the Tomorrow's Warriors Young Artist Development Programme have been given scholarships to take part in the Jazz House Kids Summer Workshop at Montclair State University.

In March 2017, Tomorrow's Warriors launched a new music education initiative, The Jazz Ticket, to mark the centenary of the birth of six iconic jazz figures: composer Tadd Dameron, vocalist Ella Fitzgerald, trumpeter Dizzy Gillespie, pianist Thelonious Monk, drummer Buddy Rich and percussionist Mongo Santamaria. As reported by Jazz FM, "The Jazz Ticket' will be delivered in 54 schools in Southampton, Luton, Leicestershire, Manchester, Gateshead, Brighton, Bristol, Hull and London, and engage almost 600 young people as performers and many more as audience members."

From 30 May to 3 June 2017, Tomorrow's Warriors was in residence at the Black Cultural Archives in Brixton (BCA), delivering performances and workshops alongside the BCA's Black Sound exhibition.

In 2021, the organisation's 30th anniversary was celebrated with a variety of activities, culminating with "A Great Day in London" at the Southbank Centre's Queen Elizabeth Hall, billed as "the greatest London jazz happening in a generation", as Jazzwise magazine noted: "a gathering on a par with Art Kane's iconic 1958 photo A Great Day in Harlem. Even greater, maybe, given that each musician in the sprawling QEH line-up had a common denominator, and was fundraising for the same cause: Tomorrow’s Warriors, the pioneering jazz music development charity celebrating its 30th anniversary year." A five-star review in The Telegraph concluded: "Tomorrow's Warriors' contribution to Jazz – not just British Jazz – has been nothing short of monumental. Their youth ensembles, Junior Band and Female Frontline, demonstrated the dizzy levels of talent rising from the next generation of young players. There's no doubt that it was indeed a Great Day In London."

Awards
In 2017, Tomorrow's Warriors won the Parliamentary Jazz Award for Jazz Education, and further awards went to alumni: Nérija, an all-female ensemble developed from Tomorrow's Warriors' Female Collective, won Best Newcomer, while Shabaka Hutchings was Jazz Instrumentalist of the Year. Across the categories 14 alumni were shortlisted.

Tomorrow's Warriors alumni have also been well represented at the Jazz FM Awards. In 2019, some 19 of the 39 nominees for awards were former Tomorrow's Warriors; Jazzwise reported that at the presentation ceremony "act after act cites the Tomorrow's Warriors organisation as a crucial factor in their musical development."

In October 2021, Tomorrow's Warriors was honoured with the Impact Award from Jazz FM.

Alumni
Graduates of Tomorrow's Warriors development programmes who have gone on to pursue successful careers include:

 Yazz Ahmed
 Joe Armon-Jones
 Denys Baptiste
 Moses Boyd
 Theon Cross
 Julie Dexter
 Peter Edwards
 Eska
 Nathaniel Facey
 Nubya Garcia
 Binker Golding
 Camilla George
 Shabaka Hutchings
 Soweto Kinch
 Cassie Kinoshi
 Femi Koleoso
 TJ Koleoso 
 James Mollison 
 Zara McFarlane
 Andrew McCormack
 Sheila Maurice-Grey 
 Jay Phelps
 Byron Wallen 
 Jason Yarde

References

External links
 Tomorrow's Warriors official website.
 "Tomorrow's Warriors – THE JAZZ TICKET" video.
 Tomorrow's Warriors on Facebook.
 Tomorrow's Warriors on Twitter.
 "A Look Back at A Great Day In London", Tomorrow's Warriors, 17 December 2021.

British jazz ensembles
1991 establishments in England
Jazz organizations
Music organisations based in the United Kingdom
Jazz music education
Youth organisations based in the United Kingdom